Mohamed Boussaïd (Arabic: محمد بوسعيد; born 22 April 1991) is an Algerian professional footballer who plays as a forward for Championnat National 3 club Hauts Lyonnais.

Honours 
Montceau

 Championnat de France Amateur 2: 2011–12

References 

1991 births
Living people
Footballers from Algiers
Algerian footballers
French footballers
French sportspeople of Algerian descent
Naturalized citizens of France
Algerian emigrants to France
Association football forwards
FC Montceau Bourgogne players
SC Toulon-Le Las players
FC Fleury 91 players
RC Arbaâ players
AS Saint-Priest players
Hauts Lyonnais players
Championnat National 3 players
Championnat National 2 players
Algerian Ligue Professionnelle 1 players